The Parsenn Funicular (DPB) is a funicular railway in the resort of Davos in the Swiss canton of Graubünden. The line links the town of Davos with the Weissfluhjoch ridge and the Parsenn ski area.

The funicular is composed of two separate and independent sections, with an interchange station between the two at Höhenweg. The highest section is the highest open-air funicular in Switzerland and the second highest after the Metro Alpin.

History 
The funicular opened in December 1931, to access the Weissfluhjoch ski area. The lower section was renovated with two new cars in December 2002, With the upper section being renovated in 2010.

Operation 

The line has the following parameters:

See also 
 List of funicular railways
 List of funiculars in Switzerland

References

External links 

Lower section and upper section on YouTube

Parseen
Transport in Graubünden
Railway lines opened in 1931
1200 mm gauge railways in Switzerland
800 mm gauge railways in Switzerland
1931 establishments in Switzerland
Davos